WTLT (1120 AM) is a commercial radio station licensed to Maryville, Tennessee, and serving the Knoxville radio market. It airs an urban contemporary radio format and is owned by One Major Media Group LLC.

WTLT broadcasts at 1,000 watts by day; because AM 1120 is a clear channel frequency reserved for KMOX in St. Louis, Missouri, it must sign-off at sunset to avoid interference. Listeners in the Knoxville metropolitan area can hear WTLT around the clock on its FM translator station, W246DH at 97.1 MHz, and could previously be heard on W268BP at 101.5 MHz.

History
The station signed on as WCGM in 1989. It aired a Christian radio format and was owned by Dove, Inc.

From 2007 to 2009, the then-WKCE had been a Spanish-language sports radio station as an ESPN Deportes Radio Network affiliate. Then it was an English-language sports station from 2010 to 2014. It aired a comedy radio format till January 2015, when the format changed to oldies.

WKCE changed briefly to an all-news radio format under the moniker "1120 News Now" on July 4, 2015.

WKCE returned to oldies on December 5, 2015. The station changed its call sign to WVLZ on September 19, 2018.

On March 18, 2019, WVLZ changed their format from Oldies (after stunting with Christmas music and Variety Hits) to Active Rock, branded as "101.5 VLZ" (simulcasting on FM translator W268BP 101.5 FM Knoxville). WVLZ also began simulcasting on translator W246DH 97.1 FM shortly thereafter, and this became the sole translator in February 2020.

On July 1, 2020, the call sign was changed to WJMP and the radio station rebranded as "Jump 97.1". The WJMP call letters were moved by Loud Media to start a second Jump station in Plattsburgh, New York, on October 1, 2021, and this station became WTLT.

On December 14, 2021, WTLT flipped to urban contemporary and rebranded as "Lit 97.1".

Previous logo

References

External links

TLT
Radio stations established in 1985
1985 establishments in Tennessee
TLT
Urban contemporary radio stations in the United States